Raghumal Arya Vidyalaya, Kolkata, often abbreviated RAV, is a school for secondary and senior secondary education located at Vivekananda Road region of Kolkata founded by Arya Samaj. The school is affiliated to the State Boards WBBSE and WBCHSE and around 1,000 pupils are educated in it. The medium of instruction in this school is both in English and Hindi.Fee of the school is very affordable and teachers gives a good quality of education to the students. Its proper maintenance and management is done under Arya Samaj Trust.

Faculty
There are many subjects which are taught on Madhyamik & Higher Secondary Examination level, and each teacher is dedicated to a single subject.

Some of the Faculty of this school according to subjects they taught are :
श्री Dinesh Singh, Maths, (Principal)
श्रीमति K. Goswami, English
श्रीमति C.Giri, English
श्रीमति J.Das, Maths
श्रीमति B.R.Kujur, Hindi
श्रीमति S. Sarkar, Chemistry
श्री S. Kr. Shaw (gold medalist), Chemistry
श्री M. Sharma, Geography
श्रीमति N. Ku. Yadav, History
श्रीमति A. Chakraborty, W.ed.
श्रीमति M. Goswami, English
श्री A. kr. Dubey, Physical Sc.
NOTE:- No teacher for physics.

Facility
Every student in this school is provided with the Midday Meal under the Midday Meal Scheme of Government of India and proper guidance is given to every student to maintain discipline. A big hall is present at the ground floor for celebrations, ceremonies, and rituals. Other facilities are also given like:
Senior Division NCC
Computer Lab
Library
Laboratory for (Physics, Chemistry, Biology)

Religious ceremony celebration
Every year school organize the programme related to either religious or national to give them a spirit of good faith and a good citizen of their country. The celebration of programme in school is done on following occasion:

Saraswati Puja
Independence Day, on 15 August
Republic Day, on 26 January
Children's Day, on 14 November
Teacher's Day on 5 September

Subjects taught
As this school is affiliated to WBBSE, so up to class X every subject is compulsory for all students who want to appear in the Madhyamik Examination. The examination at madhyamik level is conducted in both English and Hindi medium in this school. The subject combinations are as follows:

 
On Higher level it is affiliated with WBCHSE so for class XI & XII the students have to decide in which stream they want to go, generally there are three stream available to the students these are Arts, Commerce, & Science. In this school three streams Arts, Science and Commerce is available for the students which is conducted in English/Hindi medium. The subject combinations are as follows:

External links
 Official website

Schools affiliated with the Arya Samaj
Primary schools in West Bengal
High schools and secondary schools in West Bengal
Schools in Kolkata
Educational institutions established in 1936
1936 establishments in India